Patric Laine Zimmerman (born October 10, 1954 in Los Angeles, California) is a retired American voice actor.

Career
Due to Daws Butler's death in 1988, he voiced Elroy Jetson in the 1990 film Jetsons: The Movie. He also did the voices of Augie Doggie and Dixie in the Hanna-Barbera series Fender Bender 500 and Yo Yogi!, both roles that Butler had originated. He continued his career in the 1990s where he provided the voices for characters in the animated television series TaleSpin and Tom & Jerry Kids.

In 1995, Zimmerman appeared in person in the 1995 movie Stripteaser with Maria Ford and Rick Dean.

Zimmerman is recognized by many in the video game community as the first and most prominent voice of Revolver Ocelot in the Metal Gear Solid series.

As of 2008, Zimmerman is retired from voice acting.

Personal life
Zimmerman was married to voice director Kris Zimmerman from approximately 1985 until 1992-1993.

Filmography
Film
 Jetsons: The Movie (1990) – Elroy Jetson
  Eddie Presley (1992) – Cook

Television
 Pound Puppies (1986) – Charlie, Boy Scout, Boy at the Dance, Shaky
 Popeye and Son (1987) - Additional voices
 The New Yogi Bear Show (1988) – Additional voices
 Yogi and the Invasion of the Space Bears (1988) – Ranger Brown
 TaleSpin (1990) – Joe Cropduster
 Tom & Jerry Kids (1990–1993) – Tyke
 Wake, Rattle, and Roll (Fender Bender segment) – Augie Doggie, Dixie
 Yo Yogi! (1991) – Augie Doggie, Dixie, Ding-A-Ling Wolf
 Toxic Crusaders (1991) – Junkyard
 Capitol Critters (1992) – Felix
 The Shnookums and Meat Funny Cartoon Show (1995) – Obediah the Wonder Raccoon
 The Grim Adventures of Billy & Mandy (2005–2007) – Dan Blort, Beetle, additional voices

Video games
 Metal Gear Solid (1998) – Revolver Ocelot
 Metal Gear Solid 2: Sons of Liberty (2001) – Revolver Ocelot
 Metal Gear Solid: The Twin Snakes (2004) – Revolver Ocelot
 Dead Rising (2006) – Commanding Officer
 Metal Gear Solid 4: Guns of the Patriots (2008) – Liquid Ocelot

Theme parks
 The Funtastic World of Hanna-Barbera (ride)'' (1990) – Elroy Jetson

References

External links
 

1954 births
Living people
American male voice actors
Male actors from Los Angeles